The Chautauqua Hall of Brotherhood (also known as the Chautauqua Auditorium and Lakeyard) is a historic site in DeFuniak Springs, Walton County, Florida. It was constructed as part of the Chautauqua education movement and is located at 95 Circle Drive. It is now used to house a branch of the Walton County Chamber of Commerce. On August 7, 1972, it was added to the U.S. National Register of Historic Places.

In 1989, the building was listed in A Guide to Florida's Historic Architecture, published by the University of Florida Press.

References

External links

 Walton County listings at National Register of Historic Places
 Florida's Office of Cultural and Historical Programs
 Walton County listings
 Walton County markers
 Chautauqua Hall of Brotherhood
 Walton County Chamber of Commerce - Visit DeFuniak Springs
 Florida Chautauqua Center

Clubhouses on the National Register of Historic Places in Florida
Buildings and structures in Walton County, Florida
National Register of Historic Places in Walton County, Florida